Heidi Mohr (29 May 1967 – 7 February 2019) was a German footballer who played as a forward. She was renowned for her speed and her ability to shoot with both feet. In 1999 she was voted Europe's Footballer of the Century.

Club career
Mohr played in the Bundesliga for TuS Ahrbach, TuS Niederkirchen, and 1. FFC Frankfurt. She was top scorer in the Bundesliga for five consecutive years from 1991 to 1995.

International career
Mohr's debut was against Norway on 19 May 1986. She had 104 appearances for Germany's national team and won the 1989, 1991 and 1995 Women's EURO. She scored eight times at European Championships and ten times at World Cups. With 83 career goals she was Germany's all-time top scorer until Birgit Prinz overtook her in 2005. Mohr's last game was on 29 September 1996 against Iceland.

Death
Mohr died in February 2019, aged 51, after suffering from cancer.

Career statistics

International goals
Scores and results list Germany's goal tally first, score column indicates score after each Mohr goal.

Matches and goals scored at World Cup and Olympic tournaments
Heidi Mohr competed in two FIFA Women's World Cup: China 1991 and Sweden 1995; and one Olympics: Atlanta 1996; played 15 matches and scored 11 goals
Mohr with her Germany team finished third at the 1991 Women's World Cup, held in China.

Honours
TuS Niederkirchen
 Bundesliga: 1992–93

1. FFC Frankfurt
 Bundesliga: 1998–99
 DFB-Pokal: 1998–99, 1999–2000

Germany
 UEFA Women's Championship: 1989, 1991, 1995

Individual
 Bundesliga top scorer: 1990–91, 1991–92, 1992–93, 1993–94, 1994–95
 UEFA Women's Championship top scorer: 1991
 FIFA Women's World Cup Silver Shoe: 1991
 Silbernes Lorbeerblatt: 1989, 1991, 1995

References

Match reports

1967 births
2019 deaths
Women's association football forwards
Footballers at the 1996 Summer Olympics
German women's footballers
Germany women's international footballers
FIFA Century Club
1991 FIFA Women's World Cup players
1995 FIFA Women's World Cup players
Olympic footballers of Germany
UEFA Women's Championship-winning players
People from Weinheim
Sportspeople from Karlsruhe (region)
Footballers from Baden-Württemberg
1. FFC 08 Niederkirchen players
1. FFC Frankfurt players